A becard is a bird of the genus Pachyramphus in the family Tityridae.

Taxonomy
The genus Pachyramphus was introduced in 1839 by the English zoologist George Robert Gray in the volume on birds by John Gould that formed part of Charles Darwin's Zoology of the Voyage of H.M.S. Beagle. The type species was designated by Gray in 1840 as the green-backed becard (Pachyramphus viridis). The generic name is from the Ancient Greek pakhus meaning "stout" or "thick" and rhamphos meaning "bill". 

The genus had traditionally been placed in Cotingidae or Tyrannidae, but evidence strongly suggests that it is better placed in the family Tityridae, where it is now placed by the IOC.

Extant species
The genus contains seventeen species:

Former species
Some authorities, either presently or formerly, recognize several additional species as belonging to the genus Pachyramphus including:
 Rusty-vented canastero (as Bathmidura Dorbignyi)

Description
The becards are characterized by their large heads with a slight crest. The smaller members of this genus have graduated tails and most members are sexually dimorphic, although the cinnamon becard and the chestnut-crowned becard have similar plumages for the males and females. Juvenile becards resemble the adult females in plumage and, as far as known, obtain their adult plumage after about a year. The bills of the becards are grey, and many (but not all) have a black culmen or upper mandible. Their legs are dark gray.

Distribution and habitat
They are primarily found in Central and South America, but the rose-throated becard occurs as far north as southern United States and, as suggested by its common name, the Jamaican becard is restricted to Jamaica. Depending on the species, they are found in wooded habitats ranging from open woodland to the dense canopy of rainforests.

Breeding
The nest of a becard is a bulky globular mass of dead leaves, mosses, and fibers with the entrance near the bottom of the nest. Nests are typically wedged or slung from the outer branches of trees at the mid or upper levels.

References

Taxa named by George Robert Gray
Taxonomy articles created by Polbot